"I Knew You Were Waiting (for Me)" is a song released by American singer Aretha Franklin and English singer George Michael as a duet in 1987. The song was a number one hit in the United States and the United Kingdom. Billboard listed "I Knew You Were Waiting (for Me)" as Franklin's all-time biggest Hot 100 single. The song was Franklin's biggest hit on the Billboard Adult Contemporary chart, reaching number two. The song was written by Simon Climie and Dennis Morgan and produced by Narada Michael Walden. Franklin and Michael won a 1987 Grammy Award for Best R&B Performance by a Duo or Group with Vocal for "I Knew You Were Waiting (For Me)".

Background and recording
In 1984, Michael was approached to write and produce a song for Franklin for an unspecified soundtrack album; however, his busy schedule with Wham! made it impossible for him to do so at the time. Michael was also anxious that writing for one of his favourite artists could be too nerve-wracking (considering himself to be unworthy) and that for Franklin to sing a song he had written would be "ludicrous". According to Michael, he originally approached both Michael Jackson and Stevie Wonder respectively, before Franklin.

Following Michael's death in December 2016, Franklin recalled the following about the recording of "I Knew You Were Waiting (for Me)":The first time I heard George was with Wham! and I liked it then. He had a very unique sound, very different from anything that was out there. When Clive (Davis, Franklin's producer and label boss) suggested we get together for "I Knew You Were Waiting," I was all ready. It reminded me of (working with producer) Jerry Wexler. We'd go in the studio and cut songs. If we were happy with what we recorded, Jerry would say "Let's wait until tomorrow. If we feel the same way (then) that we do now, maybe we have a hit." "I Knew You Were Waiting" had that. Musically, it does not grow old.

Reception and chart performance
The song was a one-off project that helped Michael achieve his ambition to sing with one of his favorite artists, and it reached number one on both the UK Singles Chart and Billboard Hot 100, becoming her 16th and last top 10 hit single. The song was Franklin's first and only UK number-one hit.

In his book titled Dynamic Duets: The Best Pop Collaborations from 1955 to 1999, author Bob Leszczak described "I Knew You Were Waiting (for Me)" as a "joyous and uplifting duet".

Music video
The official music video for the song was directed by Andy Morahan. It begins with George Michael and two bodyguards entering a dark room. There is a large viewing screen on the wall showing Aretha Franklin preparing for George Michael. Over the course of the video, each of the singers are shown performing the song both in front of the screen and on it. During the second verse, footage from both Franklin's and Michael's earlier careers is shown on the screen. As the second chorus ends, Michael joins Franklin on the stage, and footage of earlier famous duet pairs—Marvin Gaye and Tammi Terrell, Sonny and Cher, Ike and Tina Turner, and others—are shown on the viewing screen while Michael and Franklin sing the song's bridge. At the end of the video, Franklin winks at the camera.

Personnel
 Aretha Franklin – lead vocals
 George Michael – lead vocals
 Walter Afanasieff – synthesizers, Moog synth bass, programming
 Corrado Rustici – Charvel MIDI guitar synthesizer
 Randy Jackson – bass guitar
 Narada Michael Walden – drums
 Preston Glass – drum programming, percussion
 Gigi Gonaway – tambourine, percussion
 Jerry Hey – string arrangement
 Kitty Beethoven – backing vocals
 Kevin Dorsey – backing vocals
 Jim Gilstrap – backing vocals
 Jennifer Hall – backing vocals
 Myrna Matthews – backing vocals
 Claytoven Richardson – backing vocals
 Jeanie Tracy – backing vocals

Charts and certifications

Year-end charts

Certifications

References

1986 songs
1987 singles
Aretha Franklin songs
Arista Records singles
Billboard Hot 100 number-one singles
Cashbox number-one singles
Dutch Top 40 number-one singles
European Hot 100 Singles number-one singles
George Michael songs
Hear'Say songs
Male–female vocal duets
Number-one singles in Australia
Number-one singles in Zimbabwe
Music videos directed by Andy Morahan
Song recordings produced by Narada Michael Walden
Songs written by Simon Climie
Songs written by Dennis Morgan (songwriter)
UK Singles Chart number-one singles